The John A. Crabtree House is a historic house located at 15 Factory Street in the village of Montgomery, Orange County, New York.

Description and history 
It is a -story, Queen Anne style frame dwelling with a cross-gable roof. It features a wraparound porch and fishscale shingles on the gable ends. It is a short distance from the Montgomery Worsted Mills, co-owned by Crabtree and his partner Arthur Patchett, who also lived nearby. The house had been built by Crabtree's father William, and remained in the family for a long time.

It was added to the National Register of Historic Places on August 6, 1998.

References

Houses on the National Register of Historic Places in New York (state)
Queen Anne architecture in New York (state)
Houses completed in 1899
Houses in Orange County, New York
National Register of Historic Places in Orange County, New York